Peter Tholse  (born ) is a former Swedish male volleyball player. He was part of the Sweden men's national volleyball team at the 1988 Summer Olympics and 1990 FIVB Volleyball Men's World Championship. He played for Spoleto.

Clubs
  Mantua (1990)
  Spoleto (1994)

References

1965 births
Living people
Swedish men's volleyball players
Place of birth missing (living people)
Volleyball players at the 1988 Summer Olympics
Olympic volleyball players of Sweden